Salto Grande may refer to:

 Salto Grande, São Paulo, a municipality in Brazil
 Salto Grande (waterfall), within the Torres del Paine National Park in Chile
 Salto Grande Dam, on the Uruguay River, between Uruguay and Argentina
 Salto Grande Bridge, crossing the Uruguay River, joining Argentina and Uruguay